The Sawtooth is a jagged arête joining Mount Bierstadt to (eventually) Mount Evans in the Front Range of central Colorado.  The three points along this arête resemble the teeth of a saw, leading to its name.  The southeast wall of the arête is the head of the cirque above Abyss Lake, while its northwest wall is the cirque at the head of a valley above Guanella Pass.  The northeast end of the sawtooth joins directly to the shoulder of Mount Spalding, from which a second (and slightly less abrupt) arête leads southeast to Mount Evans.  This second arête divides the glacial valley of Abyss Lake to the southwest from the cirque of Summit Lake, to the northeast.

See also

List of Colorado mountain ranges
List of Colorado mountain summits
List of Colorado fourteeners
List of Colorado 4000 meter prominent summits
List of the most prominent summits of Colorado
List of Colorado county high points

References

External links

The Sawtooth on 13ers.com
The Sawtooth on Listsofjohn.com
The Sawtooth on Peakbagger.com
The Sawtooth on Peakery.com
Sawtooth on Summitpost.org

Landforms of Colorado
Ridges of Colorado
Rock formations of Colorado
Landforms of Clear Creek County, Colorado
North American 4000 m summits